The Alehouse dagger or bum dagger (also occasionally a swapping dagger, close-hilted dagger, and ale dagger) is a type of long, heavy English dagger or shortsword.  It was the standard form of dagger in England from the sixteenth to the mid eighteenth centuries, and consisted of a long, broad, straight blade, with a large, heavy basket hilt which was used as a knuckle duster.  They generally weighed two or three pounds, and were worn on the lower back (hence the term bum dagger). They were common civilian weapons, effective against swords and polearms, and short enough to be used easily in the confines of a crowded pub.

References

Bibliography
 Newcastle, The Truth of the Sorde, f9b (c. 1670)
 Sir John Smythe, Certain Discourses, p. 4a-5b (London 1590)
 John Lyly, “Pappe With a Hathcet” in The Complete Works of John Lyly, Vol 3, p. 394 (1967)
 George Wither, “Of Covetousness: Satire VIII” in The uncompleted edition of Wither's poems Vol.1, ed. by J.M. Gutch (London 1622)
 Thomas Nash, “A countercuffe given to Martin Junior” (1589), p. 126 in The British Bibliographer by Sir Egerton Brydges, Volume 2 (London 1812)
 Samuel Rowlands, The Letting of Humours Blood in the Head Vaine, &c, p. 14 & 34 (Edinburgh, 1815)
 Barnaby Rich, Irish Hubbub, f 2 (1617)
 Index Supplement to the Notes and Queries, p. 196 (Northampton, 1894). The reference is to the poem Hudibras by Samuel Butler (1613–1680)
 Cyril Mazansky "British Basket-hilted Swords: A Typology of Basket-type Sword Hilts", p. 12 (Leeds, 2005)
 Ben Jonson's Walk to Scotland: An Annotated Edition of the 'Foot Voyage', edited by James Loxley, Anna Groundwater, Julie Sanders (Cambridge 2014)
 Five Old Plays ed J. Payne Collier p. 48-9 (London 1833)
 Articles for the due Execution of the Statutes of Apparell, quoted in Norman, A.V.B, The Rapier and Smallsword, 1460 - 1820 (1980) p. 23
 Joseph Swetnam, The Schoole of the Noble and Worthy Science of Defence (1617), p. 184, 185 & 169
 Silver, George, Brief Instructions upon my Paradoxes of Defence (C.1605), Ch.8 Pt.4 & Pt.5
 Captain James Miller, A treatise on backsword, sword, buckler, sword and dagger, sword and great gauntlet, falchon, quarterstaff. Plate VI (London, 1735)
 Raphael Holinshed, Holinshed's Chronicles of England, Scotland, and Ireland, ed. (1587), p. 335
 Newcastle, The Truth of the Sorde, f9b (c.1670)

Daggers